The following are the national records in Olympic weightlifting in Austria. Records are maintained in each weight class for the snatch lift, clean and jerk lift, and the total for both lifts by the Austrian Weightlifting Federation (Österreichischer Gewichtheberverband).

Current records

Men

Women

Historical records

Men (1998–2018)

Women (1998–2018)

References
General
Austrian records 20 October 2022 updated
Specific

External links
ÖGV web site

Austria
Records
Olympic weightlifting
weightlifting